Eastbourne College is a co-educational private school in the English public school tradition, for boarding and day pupils aged 13–18, in the town of Eastbourne on the south coast of England. The College's headmaster is Tom Lawson.

Overview
The college was founded by William Cavendish, 7th Duke of Devonshire, and other prominent Eastbourne citizens in 1867.

The college is in the Lower Meads area of Eastbourne, a mainly residential area. Most of the school buildings are on a central campus area but many others are scattered in the immediate vicinity, such as the Beresford hockey and the links rugby pitches.

The motto, Ex Oriente Salus, is a play on "Eastbourne", meaning "The haven [the bourne] from the East". Salus also means health.

History
Charles Hayman, an Eastbourne medical practitioner and member of the town's first council, together with other prominent local citizens, decided an independent school should be established and the support of William Cavendish, 7th Duke of Devonshire, was sought. He was supportive of the venture and provided  of land for purchase at a modest price. This link with the Cavendish family is evidenced by the stag in the school emblem.

From 1867 to 1869 it occupied Ellesmere Villa, now called Spencer Court; the location is now marked by a blue plaque. Architect Henry Currey was assigned by the duke to design a new school building, and College House, now School House, was built in 1870. The school chapel was constructed that same year.

During the 1880s, the school went through an impoverished period. Through the intervention of George Wallis, first mayor of Eastbourne and the work of new headmaster Charles Crowden, formerly of Cranbrook School, the school was saved from financial disaster.

The college is now fully coeducational.

Boarding and day houses 
Boarding houses
Gonville (Boys)
Nugent (Girls)
Pennell (Boys) 
School (Girls)
Wargrave (Boys)

Day houses

Blackwater (Girls)
Craig  (Boys)
Powell (Boys)
Reeves (Boys)
Watt (Girls)

Many of these houses were donated to the school in wills and named after their benefactors; for example, Powell was given to the college by Stanley Powell.

Extracurricular activities

Combined Cadet Force
The school's CCF corps was founded in 1896.

Sport
Sport is played at the many facilities around the college (including College Field which has been used for training by teams such as South Africa upon arrival in the UK and some internationals) and at various locations around the town acquired by the college. Former pupils who have achieved sporting success include rugby players Hugo Southwell (Scotland and London Wasps) and Mark Lock (Leeds Tykes) and cricket player Ed Giddins.

Each term at the college has a single primary sport:

There are also alternative sports, including football, cross country, swimming, golf, tennis, squash, rowing, sailing, Rugby fives, fives, and rounders. The school owns a boat house nearby the campus.

Birley Centre
On 17 October 2011, Gus Christie, chairman of the Glyndebourne Festival Opera, opened the Birley Centre. It was named after Michael Birley, former Headmaster of Eastbourne College (1956-1970), and now has facilities such as a recording studio and a state of the art theatre space.

In popular culture
The Southern Railway made great use of steam locomotive names for publicity, and the carrying of pupils to boarding schools at the beginning and end of school terms was a significant traffic flow. Locomotives of the 'V' or "Schools" Class, introduced in 1930, were hence named after prominent English public schools. The fifteenth locomotive, no. 914, was named Eastbourne after the college. Built at Eastleigh in October 1932, no. 914 remained in service until withdrawn by British Railways in July 1961.

Notable Old Eastbournians

Former pupils

Former pupils are known as "Old Eastbournians" and are members of the Old Eastbournian Association.

Nick Atkinson, lead singer of the band Rooster
Theo Bevacqua, Cardiff rugby player
Harry Bentley, jockey
Olav Bjortomt, World Quiz Champion 2003, writes quizzes in The Times newspaper
Sir Hugh Casson, architect
Aleister Crowley, occultist and mystic
Michael Fish, weather forecaster
Richard Fitter, naturalist
Ed Giddins, cricketer
Charles Hedley, naturalist
Bob Holness, presenter
David Howell, chess Grandmaster
Johnny Mercer Minister for Veterans Affairs
Eddie Izzard, comedian
Nasser Judeh, Jordanian former Minister of Foreign Affairs
Sam Kiley, security editor of Sky News
Jules Knight, actor and singer
Timothy Landon, soldier
Oliver W F Lodge, poet and author
Ruari McLean, designer
Archibald Morres, cricketer
Ian Mortimer, historian and historical biographer
Adam Mynott, BBC journalist
Michael Praed, actor
Charles Rivett-Carnac, Commissioner of Royal Canadian Mounted Police
David Smith, historian and Fellow of Selwyn College, Cambridge
Frederick Soddy, chemist and Nobel laureate
Sirichok Sopha, Thai politician
Hugo Southwell, rugby player
Ed Speleers, actor, played Eragon in the Inheritance Cycle and footman Jimmy in the ITV drama Downton Abbey
Gwilym Lloyd George, 1st Viscount Tenby, politician
David Lloyd George, 2nd Viscount Tenby
William Lloyd George, 3rd Viscount Tenby
John Wells, satirist, co-author of the Dear Bill column in Private Eye
Woodrow Lyle Wyatt, Baron Wyatt of Weeford, politician, journalist and diarist
Royce Mills, actor
John Young, cricketer
James Yuill, folktronica musician
Theodore Leighton Pennell, missionary and eccentric
Alex Simcox, cricketer
Hugh Skinner, actor
Guy McKnight, singer/songwriter
W. P. D. Wightman, philosophical author
Professor  Peter Wildy, virologist
Thomas Wilson, cricketer
Nick Estcourt, notable extreme altitude mountaineer

Military
Wing Commander Roland Beamont, British fighter pilot
Admiral Sir Ian Forbes, former Deputy Supreme Allied Commander Atlantic.
Brigadier Timothy Landon, moderniser of the Sultanate of Oman
Major-general Hugh Prince, Chief of the Military Planning Office of the Southeast Asia Treaty Organization
General Sir David Richards, Chief of the Defence Staff
 Major General Patrick Kay, Chief of Staff of the Royal Marines and Secretary of the Defence, Press and Broadcasting Advisory Committee

Victoria Cross holders
Two Old Eastbournians have won the Victoria Cross:
Tirah Campaign, India
Captain Henry Singleton Pennell. He was a lieutenant when he performed the act for which he received the VC.
First World War
Group Captain Lionel Wilmot Brabazon Rees. He was a major when he performed the act for which he received the VC.

Military Cross holders
Second World War
Captain Peter Arthur David Baker.

Staff
 John Kendall-Carpenter
 Roger Knight
 John Shepherd
 Min Patel

Notes
 College Archives
 Allom, Vincent Mulcaster; Eastbourne College (1967). Ex Oriente Salus - A Centenary History of Eastbourne College. .

References

Bibliography

External links
 School website
 Eastbourne College Society
 Profile on the Good Schools Guide
 ISI Inspection Reports
 Ofsted Social Care Inspection Reports

1867 establishments in England
Schools in Eastbourne
Educational institutions established in 1867
Member schools of the Headmasters' and Headmistresses' Conference
Private schools in East Sussex
Boarding schools in East Sussex